Khursheed Ahmed Junejo is a Pakistani politician who has been a Member of the National Assembly of Pakistan since August 2018. Previously he was a member of the Provincial Assembly of Sindh, from May 2013 to May 2018.

Early life and education
He was born on 11 October 1954 in Larkana.

He has a degree of Bachelors of Science and degree of Master of Arts in International Relation.

Political career

He was elected to the Provincial Assembly of Sindh as a candidate of Pakistan Peoples Party (PPP) from Constituency PS-38 LARKANA-CUM KAMBAR SHAHDADKOT-I  in 2013 Pakistani general election.

He was elected to the National Assembly of Pakistan as a candidate of PPP from Constituency NA-201 (Larkana-II) in 2018 Pakistani general election.

References

Living people
Sindh MPAs 2013–2018
1954 births
Pakistan People's Party politicians
Pakistani MNAs 2018–2023